McPartlin as a surname may refer to:
 Anna McPartlin (born 1972), Irish novelist
 Anthony McPartlin (born 1975), aka Ant, British actor, singer and television presenter; one half of the Ant & Dec duo
 Frank McPartlin (1872–1943), American baseball player
Robert F. McPartlin (1926-1987), American politician
 Ryan McPartlin (born 1975), American actor

Patronymic surnames